Sebastian Ross (born 7 May 1993) is a professional Australian rules footballer playing for the St Kilda Football Club in the Australian Football League (AFL). 
He is the cousin of Jobe Watson and nephew of Tim Watson.

AFL career
Ross was recruited by the club with draft pick 25 in the 2011 National Draft. He made his debut in Round 22, 2012, against  at Docklands Stadium.

On August 20, 2016 he received the Ian Stewart Medal for best on ground in the Saint's Round 22 victory over Richmond. In 2017 and 2019 he won the Trevor Barker Award for St Kilda's best and fairest.

Ross was one of the league's most consistent midfielders between 2016 and 2019, averaging at least 26 disposals per game each year. He averaged over 10 Brownlow votes in this period, highlighted by a 14-vote effort in the 2017 Brownlow Medal.

Statistics
 Statistics are correct to the end of round 7, 2022

|- style="background:#eaeaea;"
! scope="row" style="text-align:center" | 2012
| style="text-align:center" | 
| 6 || 1 || 0 || 0 || 5 || 3 || 8 || 0 || 4 || 0.0 || 0.0 || 5.0 || 3.0 || 8.0 || 0.0 || 4.0 || 0
|-
! scope="row" style="text-align:center" | 2013
| style="text-align:center" | 
| 6 || 13 || 3 || 1 || 72 || 125 || 197 || 35 || 42 || 0.2 || 0.1 || 5.5 || 9.6 || 15.2 || 2.7 || 3.2 || 0
|- style="background-color: #EAEAEA"
! scope="row" style="text-align:center" | 2014
|
| 6 || 13 || 1 || 2 || 112 || 94 || 206 || 35 || 43 || 0.1 || 0.2 || 8.6 || 7.2 || 15.8 || 2.7 || 3.3 || 0
|-
! scope="row" style="text-align:center" | 2015
| style="text-align:center" | 
| 6 || 10 || 1 || 3 || 93 || 89 || 182 || 26 || 41 || 0.1 || 0.3 || 9.3 || 8.9 || 18.2 || 2.6 || 4.1 || 0
|- style="background:#eaeaea;"
! scope="row" style="text-align:center" | 2016
| style=:text-align:center"|  
| 6 || 22 || 3 || 5 || 299 || 283 || 582 || 95 || 96 || 0.1 || 0.2 || 13.6 || 12.9 || 26.5 || 4.3 || 4.4 || 10
|-
! scope="row" style="text-align:center" | 2017
|
| 6 || 22 || 5 || 9 || 318 || 339 || 657 || 79 || 94 || 0.2 || 0.4 || 14.5 || 15.4 || 29.9 || 3.6 || 4.3 || 14
|- style="background:#eaeaea;"
! scope="row" style="text-align:center" | 2018
|
| 6 || 21 || 3 || 8 || 337 || 295 || 632 || 114 || 83 || 0.1 || 0.4 || 16.0 || 14.0 || 30.1 || 5.4 || 4.0 || 6
|-
! scope="row" style="text-align:center" | 2019
|
| 6 || 22 || 6 || 7 || 323 || 249 || 572 || 84 || 90 || 0.3 || 0.3 || 14.7 || 11.3 || 26.0 || 3.8 || 4.1 || 12
|- style="background:#eaeaea;"
! scope="row" style="text-align:center" | 2020
|
| 6 || 16 || 2 || 2 || 146 || 141 || 287 || 29 || 45 || 0.1 || 0.1 || 9.1 || 8.8 || 17.9 || 1.8 || 2.8 || 1
|-
! scope="row" style="text-align:center" | 2021
|
| 6 || 20 || 5 || 8 || 225 || 195 || 420 || 91 || 61 || 0.3 || 0.4 || 11.3 || 9.8 || 21.0 || 4.6 || 3.1 || 0
|- style="background:#eaeaea;"
! scope="row" style="text-align:center" | 2022
|
| 6 || 7 || 1 || 0 || 96 || 80 || 176 || 28 || 20 || 0.1 || 0.0 || 13.7 || 11.4 || 25.1 || 4.0 || 2.9 || TBA
|- class="sortbottom"
! colspan=3| Career
! 167
! 30
! 45
! 2026
! 1893
! 3919
! 616
! 619
! 0.2
! 0.3
! 12.1
! 11.3
! 23.5
! 3.7
! 3.7
! 43
|}

Notes

References

External links

1993 births
Living people
St Kilda Football Club players
Australian rules footballers from Victoria (Australia)
Greater Western Victoria Rebels players
Sandringham Football Club players
North Ballarat Football Club players
Trevor Barker Award winners